General elections were held in the Netherlands Antilles on 15 November 1954. 

The 22 seats in the Estates of the Netherlands Antilles consisted of twelve for Curaçao, eight for Aruba, one for Bonaire and one for the SSS Islands.

Results

Curaçao
Population: 114,683 (31 December 1953)
Entitled to vote: 44,363
Valid votes: 37,097
Seats: 12
Average valid votes per seat: 3,091.4

Aruba
Population: 57,303 (31 December 1953)
Valid votes: 13,983
Seats: 8
Average valid votes per seat: 1,747.875

Bonaire
Population: 5,386 (31 December 1953)
Valid votes: ?
Seats: 1

SSS Islands
Population: 3,678 (31 December 1953)
Valid votes: 1,250
Seats: 1

Aftermath 
The new session of the Estates began around 8 December 1954. Before that Jonckheer, Kroon, Van der Meer and Lampe gave up their position in the parliament to become government ministers in the First Jonckheer cabinet. They were succeeded by Hueck, Van der Linde-Helmijr, Rosario and Lopes. Van der Linde-Helmijr was at that moment the only female in the parliament but not the first one; A.A. de Lannoy-Elisabeth was from 1949 until 1954 a female member of the Estates. Anslijn became a member of the parliament instead of Maduro.

Early 1955 Voges became a member of the parliament to replace Debrot and later that year O.R.A. Beaujon, Pieters Kwiers and P. Croes were succeeded by Bikker, Abbad and Finck. A year later Sint Jago succeeded Gerharts. After Eman died he was replaced by De Cuba.

References 
 Amigoe di Curaçao, 21 September 1954
 Amigoe di Curaçao, 23 September 1954
 Amigoe di Curaçao, 16 November 1954
 Know Your Political History: St. Maarten, Saba, St. Eustatius, by Edgar Lynch & Julian Lynch, Election Watchnite Association, 1990, page 25 & 55

Elections in the Netherlands Antilles
Netherlands Antilles